Darco is a modern artist

Darco may also refer to:
Darco company D'Addario
Darco, champion horse of Ludo Philippaerts

See also
 Darko (given name)
 Darko (surname)